Zhuliany is a neighbourhood in the south-west of Kyiv, the capital of Ukraine. It is a predominantly cottage-built area, part of the Solomianskyi district. As well as Troieshchyna, Zhuliany became a part of Kyiv municipality in 1988.

The Kyiv International Airport is located in the neighborhood.

An apartment building was hit by a Russian missile strike during the 2022 Russian invasion of Ukraine.

References

Neighborhoods in Kyiv
Holosiivskyi District